Hu Jun (born March 18, 1968) is a Chinese actor best known for playing dramatic roles in various films and television series. He has acted in a number of Hong Kong films.

Biography
Hu Jun was born on March 18, 1968, to Wang Yiman, a drama actress, and Hu Baoshan, a singer. His uncle Hu Songhua is a tenor singer. He has an aunt named Hu Xin. Hu has two sisters, Hu Lan and Hu Rong.

In 1999, Hu Jun married Lu Fang, a drama actress from Central Academy of Drama. Their daughter, Hu Jiujiu, was born on September 9, 2001; their son, Hu Haokang, was born on November 11, 2008.

Filmography

Film

Television series

Theatre

Awards and nominations

References

External links

 
 Chinese Movie Database Hu Jun at the Chinese Movie Database
 Hu Jun's page on Orange Sky Entertainment Group's website
  Hu Jun's weibo on Sina.com

 

1968 births
Male actors from Beijing
Living people
Manchu male actors
People with acquired residency of Hong Kong
Golden Bauhinia Awards - Best Actor
Chinese male film actors
Chinese male television actors
Central Academy of Drama alumni
21st-century Chinese male actors